The Severn Beach line is a local railway line in Bristol and South Gloucestershire, England. The first sections of the line were opened in 1863 as part of the Bristol Port Railway and Pier; the section through Bristol was opened in 1875 as the Clifton Extension Railway. The line has faced several threats of closure over the years, and has been reduced to single track in many places. In recent years however it has experienced a surge in passenger numbers, with a 90% increase in the years 2007–11. The line carries little freight traffic, with most of the heavy freight traffic to Avonmouth Docks being routed via the Henbury Loop Line through Filton. The line has been highlighted by Thomas Cook as one of the scenic lines of Europe.

Route 
From , the line heads east, diverging from the Great Western Main Line, Wessex Main Line and Heart of Wessex Line at Bristol East Junction. The line curves to the north, passing under the A4320 and then joining with a chord from the Great Western Main Line at Dr Day's Junction. At this point there are four tracks, but this narrows to two before . Continuing north, the line passes under the old Midland Railway Bristol to Gloucester Line, passes through , then diverges west from the Cross Country Route at Narroways Hill Junction. The line from here is single track, passing through some woodlands and circling the St Werburghs area, passing under the B4052 (Ashley Hill) before reaching . The line then passes over the A38 Cheltenham Road on a viaduct known as "The Arches", before reaching  and passing along a straight cutting through Cotham before reaching . This is the line's main passing point, as it is one of the few remaining places with double track. The line then enters the mile-long Clifton Down Tunnel, reappearing in the Avon Gorge. Avonmouth has a passing loop, but is not often used as a passing place. Beyond Avonmouth, the line passes through a small residential area before reaching Avonmouth Docks. A freight yard is to the east of the line here, used for coal trains.  is within the yard, and to the north the Henbury Loop Line diverges to the east.

Beyond Severn Beach, the line used to continue north through the town and along the banks of the Severn, meeting the Bristol and South Wales Union Railway's line near .

The line has been listed among Thomas Cook's most favoured attractions for its scenic route along the River Avon and River Severn.

Services 
Services along the line are operated by Great Western Railway, mainly using diesel  Turbo units. Until mid-2017, the line had been operated by  Sprinter units, occasionally supplemented by  Super Sprinter and  Express Sprinter units. Until 2012,  Pacer units were a regular sight, but these were moved south to work in Devon following a cascade of Class 150/1 units from London Midland and London Overground.

There is a similar level of service on Saturdays. Sunday sees a roughly hourly service to and from Bristol, with all daytime services extended to Severn Beach.

Clifton Down is the line's main passing point, so trains to Avonmouth usually arrive at the same time as trains to Bristol Temple Meads. Most trains call at all stations. The typical journey time from Temple Meads to Avonmouth is 28 minutes, and 37 minutes to Severn Beach.

All stations on the line are in Travel Zone A (Bristol City) apart from Severn Beach which is in Zone C.

History

The Bristol Port Railway and Pier 

Bristol sits on the River Avon, with its docks several miles inland. By the 19th century, ships had grown to such a size that navigating the Avon was not possible any more, and so ships would have to dock at the head of the river at Avonmouth instead. The railway's act of parliament was passed on 17 July 1862, and the railway opened on 6 March 1865, running from a terminus called Clifton in the Avon Gorge.

As built, the railway was isolated from the rest of the national network, having not been intended for anything more than local traffic, so a connection to the main line railways was needed in order to develop Avonmouth as a port. However, due to the position of Clifton station and the large amount of developed land in the Hotwells area, an extension towards Bristol Temple Meads, the city's main station, would have been prohibitively expensive. Instead, a link was proposed from the BPRP at Sneyd Park, running under Clifton Down and through the suburbs to connect to the main lines of the Midland and Bristol and South Wales Union railways. The connection was authorised in 1867, but the BPRP was in financial difficulties, and so unable to complete the line. It entered into negotiations with the Midland and Great Western Railways (the latter now the owner of the Bristol and South Wales Union Railway).

Clifton Extension Railway 

The line was managed by the Clifton Extension Railway Joint Committee, but in 1894 responsibility was passed to the Great Western & Midland Railways Joint Committee. Services began to Clifton Down on 1 October 1874.

There were a total of 23 trains in each direction between the two companies Monday-Saturday. On Sundays, there was no Midland service, but seven Great Western trains. The fare to Temple Meads was 6d first-class and 3d third-class.

The Clifton Down Tunnel, the final link to the Bristol Port Railway and Pier, was opened in 1877, initially allowing freight trains to reach Avonmouth Docks. In 1886, the daily Great Western service was six trains each way between Avonmouth and Temple Meads, 24 trains from Clifton Down to Temple Meads and 26 the other direction. The Midland provided 12 services from Clifton Down to Fishponds, and 11 back.

The first was received in October 1885, but was rejected due to the estimated cost of £3,410 to provide the station. A second petition was rejected eighteen months later. The Bristol Chamber of Commerce petitioned for a station in 1892, but the Committee again rejected the request, stating that estimated traffic levels would not justify the expense. It took until 1896 until a revised plan was accepted by the committee. The station finally opened on 12 April 1897.

In 1910, Clifton Down saw 17 Great Western services from Avonmouth to Temple Meads and 15 the other way, a further 20 trains each day operating between Clifton and Temple Meads, and 13 Midland trains each way between Clifton and Fishponds or Mangotsfield. Midland services were suspended from 1 January 1917 to 15 May 1919 due to the First World War. The  section of the Bristol Port Railway and Pier closed in 1922, so to compensate, an additional six trains were provided from Clifton Down to Avonmouth, and four back.

In 1923, grouping resulted in the Midland Railway being absorbed into the London, Midland and Scottish Railway (LMS), and the line continued in a joint arrangement between the Great Western and the LMS. The Second World War saw the end of services to Fishponds and Mangotsfield, the last operating on 31 March 1941. By 1947, just before the start of the British Rail era, there were 33 services each direction between Avonmouth and Temple Meads, and 18 on Sundays.

British Rail 

When the railways were nationalised in 1948, the Severn Beach line came under the aegis of the Western Region of British Railways. Passenger numbers however dropped sharply in 1961 as the result of a fare increase, and so in 1962 a new reduced timetable was enacted, which lost more passengers, and saw the withdrawal of a special schoolchildren's service. A year later in 1963, the Beeching report suggested that all services along the line be withdrawn. Following meetings with staff, it was decided to keep the line open to Severn Beach, but to close the section to Pilning, and also end services via Henbury. An enquiry followed, and in June that year the decision was reversed, on the condition that tickets be issued on the trains. Thus, on 17 July 1967, all stations along the line, other than Temple Meads, had their staff withdrawn. The decrease of costs allowed a reduction of ticket prices, but the line was still under threat until in June 1969 it was decided that the line's closure would result in significant hardship, and so a grant was allocated to ensure continued services. Most of the line was reduced to single track in late 1970, leaving Clifton Down as one of the few passing places.

In 1971 the weekday service was 20 trains in each direction, 19 calling at all stations between Bristol Temple Meads and Severn Beach and 1 train that terminated at St Andrews Road.

The first railbus concept, LEV1, would begin operations on the line less than a week later. Later model  Pacer railbuses would be a regular sight on the line until 2012.

British Rail was split into business-led sectors in the 1980s, at which time operations passed to Regional Railways. At this time, all trains ran to Severn Beach, but the service pattern was irregular. The state of the line was brought up in Parliament in 1990 by MP for Bristol North West Michael Stern, who asked why British Rail was not willing to publicise the line and protect the frequency of services. Cecil Parkinson MP, then-Secretary of State for Transport, replied that the line was using "out-of-date, worn-out rolling stock" due to late deliveries from manufacturers, and that British Rail would not encourage people to use it until there was a better service. In 1995, an hourly timetable was introduced for peak times, but services terminated at Avonmouth so that a single Sprinter unit could work the service. There was a better service on Saturdays as more rolling stock was available, but there was no Sunday service. Talk arose again of the line being closed completely. Local tourism expert Bernard Lane described the line's state as:
... the line the railway wished was not there. It was the line that got bus substitution whenever they were short of trains or queues, when a rugby match in Cardiff needed a special. It has a problem in that the route is slow and not very direct; for years it was invisible, short of marketing and lacking a regular interval timetable.

Post-privatisation 

When the railway was privatised in 1997, local services were franchised to Wales & West, which was succeeded by Wessex Trains in 2001. Following action by Friends of Severn Beach Railway (FOSBR, later renamed Friends of Suburban Bristol Railways) and a string of protests, services had increased to 10 per day in each direction by 2005, with Bristol City Council paying a subsidy of £138,000 per annum to fund services. A new subsidy agreement had been reached in 2003, following a threat that the end of subsidy would see services along the line halved. However, even with the subsidy, the line still suffered to keep the rest of the network running. Mike Holmes, station manager for most of the line's stations, told the Bristol Evening Post that:

Before we put real effort into the Severn Beach line it was really the sacrificial lamb for other services. So if we needed a spare train, we would pull one off the line and cancel it, which was why punctuality and reliability was so poor. After the public campaign in 2006 we decided that we didn't want to take that to carry on any more.

Protesters would chant "The Severn Beach is a mighty fine line; Clean and friendly and sometimes on time."

The Wessex franchise was amalgamated with the Great Western franchise into the Greater Western franchise from 2006, and responsibility passed to First Great Western, rebranded in 2015 as Great Western Railway. A 1-hour minimum service requirement was written into the new franchise agreement. In 2007, the council agreed to subsidise a service of at least one train every 45mins in each direction along the line, unanimously agreeing to pay £450,000 per annum to fund extra services from May 2008 for three years, which resulted in a 60% increase in passenger numbers along the line, and a 25% year-on-year increase between June 2009 and June 2010. Sunday services to Severn Beach were restored in 2010, funded by South Gloucestershire Council. The line was designated a community rail service in 2008.

The council subsidy was halved in 2011 at the end of the three-year deal, with the council stating that with the large increase in passenger numbers, such a large subsidy was no longer necessary. Local groups, including FOSBR and the Green Party claimed that services became less reliable following the cut, but First Great Western and the council stated that reliability problems were not due to the cut in subsidy, but instead due to breakdowns and track maintenance. The council subsidies, for both increased services and Sunday services, were due to be replaced by national funding in 2015. An additional evening service was agreed in February 2012, to start in September 2012, after protests about a 100-minute gap in the timetable.

Future 
First Great Western declined an option to continue the Greater Western franchise beyond 2013, citing a desire for a longer-term contract due to the impending upgrade to the Great Western Main Line. The franchise was put out to tender, but the process was halted and later scrapped due to the fallout from the collapse of the InterCity West Coast franchise competition. A two-year franchise extension until September 2015 was agreed in October 2013, and subsequently extended until March 2019.

With the coming upgrade to the Great Western Main Line, the main line from London to Bristol was due to be electrified by 2016; however, delays and cost overruns led to removal of Temple Meads from the programme. The electrification was not planned to extend beyond the main lines, so the Severn Beach line will continue to be served by diesel trains. Secretary of State for Transport Philip Hammond replied that it would have to be looked at in the future. Friends of Suburban Bristol Railways (FOSBR) supports the electrification of the entire Severn Beach line.

Improved services along the line are called for as part of the Greater Bristol Metro scheme, a rail transport plan which aims to enhance transport capacity in the Bristol area. There is an aspiration for half-hourly services, however due to the large sections of single-track and the congested main line from Temple Meads, such frequency is not currently feasible. However, it is expected that with the four-tracking of Filton Bank, including the Severn Beach line between Temple Meads and Narroways Hill Junction, that there will be sufficient capacity to allow half-hourly services. These services are to run from December 2017, operating 18 hours a day Monday-Saturday and 9 hours a day on Sundays.

The metro plan also calls for the reopening of the Henbury Loop Line, which could allow a service from Temple Meads to  via the Severn Beach line. The metro scheme was given the go-ahead in July 2012 as part of the City Deal, whereby local councils would be given greater control over money by the government, however it is as yet unclear which elements will be implemented. FOSBR and other local groups lodged concerns with the Department for Transport that the reopening of the Henbury Loop was not included in the ITT for the new Greater Western franchise. A one-off service, operated by First Great Western, ran on the line on 27 July 2013, but reopening is unlikely before 2018.

The new station plan was included in the Bristol Metro proposal and for some years this project has had the support of the FOSBR and the Bristol branch of the National Union of Rail, Maritime and Transport Workers.

Passenger volume 
Below are the passenger usage statistics from years starting April 2002 to April 2012. Comparing 2002 with later years has shown a general increase on the line in usage. The most recent figures have been attributed to an improved service. The high usage at Clifton Down is due in part to its proximity to Bristol Zoo and a major shopping area.

Comparing over a full decade from April 2012 to April 2002, on the main line, Lawrence Hill and Stapleton Road have increased 130% and 82% respectively. On the branch line, the stations with the biggest changes were Severn Beach, St Andrews Road and Clifton Down with 363%, 228% and 178% respectively. The lowest increase was at Shirehampton with only 35%. Montpelier, Redland, Sea Mills and Avonmouth have increased by 103%, 89%, 68% and 144% respectively.

The annual change from the year starting April 2011 to the year starting April 2012 varies from an increase of 63% at St Andrews Road through to a decrease of 2% at Redland.  During this year, Redland was the only station to see a decrease, with the average change for all stations on the line being an increase of 11%.

Whilst not based on the same methodology, the Severnside Community Rail Partnership carry out a passenger count on a particular day every June and the 2014 count had an increase in passenger usage of 16% over the 2013 count, indicating that the high growth on this line seen in previous years continues.

See also 
Rail transport in Bristol

References

External links 

http://www.severnbeachline.org – Severnside Community Rail Partnership's website for the line
http://www.fosbr.org.uk/ – Friends of Suburban Bristol Railways.